Beatrix Mahlknecht was an Italian luger who competed during the mid-1990s. A natural track luger, she won the gold medal in the women's singles event at the 1994 FIL World Luge Natural Track Championships in Gsies, Italy.

References
Natural track World Championships results: 1979-2007

Italian female lugers
Living people
Year of birth missing (living people)
Italian lugers
Sportspeople from Südtirol